Parkshore Plaza is a 29-story skyscraper located in downtown St. Petersburg, Florida. Before the Parkshore Plaza announcement, another tower called The Villas One was going to be constructed in the same lot. Original construction of the Villas was going to begin in 2002, however was cancelled in late 2002. After the cancellation of the first tower, the Parkshore Plaza was announced in early 2003. Construction of the tower began in 2004, and was completed by the summer of 2006. At , it was the tallest condominium tower in St. Petersburg until 2009, following the constriction of two new condominium towers Ovation and Signature Place. The Parkshore Plaza contains 117 total units, 96 of which are located in the tower itself and 21 are city-homes.

See also 
 List of tallest buildings in St. Petersburg, Florida

References 

Residential buildings completed in 2006
Buildings and structures in St. Petersburg, Florida
Residential condominiums in the United States
Skyscrapers in Florida
Residential skyscrapers in Florida
2006 establishments in Florida